Uvero, also known as El Uvero, is a Cuban village and consejo popular ("people's council", i.e. hamlet) of the municipality of Guamá, in Santiago de Cuba Province. In 2011 it had a population of 2,581.

History
The toponym derives from the Spanish common name of some species of Coccoloba, a genus of trees, found by Spanish explorers, at the entrance of the village, in the 18th century. On May 28, 1957, during the Cuban Revolution, the village was the field of a battle (Combate de El Uvero), between a column of M-26-7 rebels, led by Fidel Castro, and a garrison of the Cuban Army.

Geography
Located by the Caribbean Coast, below the Sierra Maestra mountain range, Uvero spans along the "Carretera del Granma" highway (part of the Circuito Sur de Oriente), between Chivirico (the municipal seat, 22 km east) and Pilón (in Granma Province, 80 km west), in a sparsely populated coastal strip.

The village, included in Turquino National Park's territory, is about 26 km east of Pico Turquino, the highest Cuban peak. It is 74 km east of Marea del Portillo, 96 km west of Santiago de Cuba and 127 km east of Niquero. Nearest villages are, to the west, La Uvita (15 km) and Ocujal (23 km); to the east Guamá Abajo (18 km).

See also
Municipalities of Cuba
List of cities in Cuba

References

External links

Populated places in Santiago de Cuba Province
Populated places established in the 18th century